Sebring station (also known as the Old Sebring Seaboard Air Line Depot and the Seaboard Air Line Passenger Station) is a train station in Sebring, Florida, United States. It is currently served by Amtrak, the national railroad passenger system.  Located on East Center Avenue, the station was constructed in 1924 by the Seaboard Air Line Railway. Approaching the transfer of passenger services to Amtrak, the station was used by the Seaboard Coast Line Railroad for the Silver Meteor, Silver Star and the Palmland. The latter train ended in 1971, while the Silver Meteor and Silver Star remain operated by Amtrak to the present. Amtrak trains formerly using the station included the Floridian, Palmetto, Sunset Limited and the short-lived intrastate Tampa-Miami Silver Palm service.

On March 16, 1990, it was added to the U.S. National Register of Historic Places.

References

External links

Sebring Amtrak Station (USA Rail Guide -TrainWeb)

Railway stations on the National Register of Historic Places in Florida
Amtrak stations in Florida
Buildings and structures in Sebring, Florida
Seaboard Air Line Railroad stations
Railway stations in the United States opened in 1924
Transportation buildings and structures in Highlands County, Florida
Vernacular architecture in Florida
National Register of Historic Places in Highlands County, Florida
1924 establishments in Florida